Lego Big Morl (stylized LEGO BIG MORL, previously lego big morl) is a Japanese rock band from Osaka, made up of four men: Takehiro Kanata (vocals, guitar), Hiroki Tanaka (guitar), Hiro Asakawa (drums), Shintarou Yamamoto (bass). It is called "lego" for short. The band is managed by Oorong-sha and signed to A-Sketch.

They started the band in Osaka in 2006, and had a tour a year later. After that, their song "Ray" was adopted as a featured song on the drama, Akai ito. The song peaked at number 41 on the Oricon singles chart and in the following year they made their major debut. Their album Quartette Parade reached number 28 on the Oricon album chart in 2009.

"Ray" was covered by Ko Shibasaki in 2010.

History

2006
After Asakawa's band split up in March, he asked Kanata to form a band with him. Tanaka, who was in the same band as Kanata, joined the new band, followed by Yamamoto, who was a friend of Kanata from high school. They started performing mainly in Osaka.

2007
They held a first live tour in Tokyo, Yokohama, Ibaraki, and Gunma in March. They gave out free CDs "" at live events.

2008
They released a ¥100 single "Moonwalk for a Week", which reached number four on the indies chart. They also released a first mini album Tuesday and Thursday. From this time, they began performing at big music festivals and events. In December, they released their first single "Ray", which became one of the songs on the soundtracks of the Fuji TV drama and movie Akai ito.

Members
 Takehiro Kanata (1984.5.24) – vocals, guitar
 Hiroki Tanaka (1984.10.25) – guitar
 Shintarou Yamamoto (1984.10.18) – bass
 Hiro Asakawa (1984.11.10) – drums

Discography

Albums

Studio albums

Extended plays

Compilation album

Singles

Notes

References

External links
 

Japanese-language singers
Japanese rock music groups
Musical groups established in 2006
Musical groups from Osaka
Musical quartets